William John Reid (born May 2, 1952) is a former American football center who played for the San Francisco 49ers of the National Football League (NFL). He played college football at Stanford University.

References 

Living people

American football centers
Stanford Cardinal football players

1952 births
Players of American football from Long Beach, California
San Francisco 49ers players